Flaming Fury is a 1926 American drama film directed by James P. Hogan and featuring Boris Karloff. A print of the film exists in the Cinematheque Royale de Belgique.

Cast
 Charles Delaney as Dan Duval
Betty May as Jeanette Duval
 Boris Karloff as Gaspard
 Eddy Chandler as Bethune

References

External links

1926 films
1926 drama films
Silent American drama films
American silent feature films
American black-and-white films
Films directed by James Patrick Hogan
Film Booking Offices of America films
1920s American films